Yılancı is a village in the district of Kastamonu, Kastamonu Province, Turkey. Its population is 72 (2021).

References

Villages in Kastamonu District